Ken Lim (born 1964) is a Singaporean concept & campaign manager, concerts & event promoter, established artiste manager, composer, music producer & publisher. He is the executive director of Hype Records.

Early life and career

Ken Lim runs one of Singapore's most established record companies, Hype Records, a set-up that does PR & Campaign concepts, Concert Promotions, Artiste & Music Promotions across the Asia Pacific region, Artiste Management, and TV & film productions.

With more than four decades of significant contribution with regards to the development of Singapore's pop culture, he excels not only in one but in many areas of the music and entertainment industry.

Reputed to be a godfather to the local music and entertainment industry since the 1980s, Lim represented Singapore in numerous song festivals and competitions since he was 16. Amongst them are, Asia Song Contest, Seoul Song Festival, and World Popular Song Festival.

In 1978, while he was still 14, he was employed as an engineer and record producer at EMI Recording Studios while still attending school.

In 1992, Lim set up Hype Records and had been its executive director.

In May 2000, the Ministry of Information and the Arts of Singapore, invited local composers were invited to rearrange the national anthem, Majulah Singapura, in F major. After selecting the version submitted by Cultural Medallion winner Phoon Yew Tien, MITA then commissioned Lim to produce a recording by the Singapore Symphony Orchestra conducted by Lim Yau, which was carried out at the Victoria Concert Hall on 20 November 2000. Lim began his career behind the scenes until he agreed to be the chief judge of the Singapore Idol. He drew substantial attention and came under the spotlight with his remarks and deadpan expressions.

Known to be brutally honest and direct with his comments, he is noted for being extremely particular on the delivery of his task.

It is known that during the first Asian Idol competition in Jakarta, Indonesia, Ken being the last judge, predicted the unlikely victory of Hady Mirza while the other judges were praising other contestants to win. On another occasion, during the audition rounds of the third season of Singapore Idol, he accurately foretold that one of the contestants, Sylvia, would be amongst the top 10 out of the thousands of participants that auditioned.

In 2010, Lim wrote and produced the official theme song, Everyone, of the 2010 Summer Youth Olympics held in Singapore from 14 to 26 August 2010.

In 2013, Lim created a Singaporean reality-singing competition programme, The Final 1. He was also one of the three judges for the show. The programme went on for a second season in 2015 with Lim as a judge again.

Since 2014, Lim is also very much involved in communications and branding for many corporations and public campaigns. Projects were in the likes of Pioneer Generation, Skillfuture, Committee for Future Economy, Lee Kuan Yew Bilingual Fund, Passion Made Possible, etc.

•	1984 – Represented Singapore at the Seoul Song Festival held in Korea with the composition 'I Live in the past';

•	1985 – Awarded the 'Most Outstanding Television Theme Song' for 2 consecutive years;

•	1991 – Commissioned to produce the official theme songs for the XI Asian Games in Beijing;

•	1993 – Commissioned to produce the official theme songs for the XVII SEA Games in Singapore;

•	1994 – Released self-debut instrumental album entitled 'Empyrean' under the EMI Taiwan International;

•	1995 – Secured a record-breaking recording contract for Stella Chang with EMI International;

•	1998 – Commissioned by the Television Corporation of Singapore to write, produce & brand its channel with the theme 'Your World at Home on 5';

•	1999 – Composed the soundtrack for the Hong Kong films The Truth About Jane and Sam and When I Fall in Love...with Both;

•	1999 – Won Best Movie Theme Song at Compass.;

•	1999 – Wrote the National Day Song 'Together'. The song was performed by artists Dreamz FM and Evelyn Tan and the MV was directed by Hong Kong director Tsui Hark;

•	2000 – Executive Producer for the TV drama series 'Chemistry';

•	2000 – Produced Singapore's millennium song Moments of Magic, starring Fann Wong, Tanya Chua and Elsa Lin.;

•	2001 – Wrote 'The 'V' in you' (performed by Dreamz FM, a local pop group), to commemorate the international year of volunteers
•	The 1st Asian composition to be presented and performed at the United Nations Assembly in New York and Asia's first cultural presence at the UN;

•	2002 – Partnered Tsui Hark, Hong Kong's top film director, and produced the world's first cyber recording artistes, AM FM

•	2002 – Won the Siggraph awards in New Orleans for the cyber recording artiste video;

•	2003 – Consultant producer – 'True Hearts Charity Show' for Community Chest;

•	2004 – Became a Judge of Singapore Idol;

•	2004 – Consultant producer – 2nd 'True Hearts Charity Show' for Community Chest;

•	2005 – Executive Producer for the TV Series 'Shooting Star';

•	2005 – Produced the National Day Song "Reach out for the Skies";

•	2004 – Consultant producer – 2nd 'True Hearts Charity Show' for Community Chest;

•	2005 – Executive Producer for the TV Series Shooting Star;

•	2005 – Named "Music Producer & Extraordinaire " in the Singapore Book of Records;

•	2006 – Returned as a judge for Singapore Idol season 2;

•	2007 – Was one of 2 primary judges alongside Dick Lee for a reality show "Live The Dream";

•	2007 – Became a Judge of Asian Idol, representing Singapore;

•	2009 – Consultant producer – 3rd 'True Hearts Charity Show' for Community Chest;

•	2009 – Returned as chief judge for Singapore Idol Season 3 & wrote the winning song Touched by an Angel

•	2010 – Promoted first ever public concert at Resort World by US artiste "Boys Like Girls"

•	2011 – Consultant producer – 'True Hearts Youth Charity Show' for Community Chest;

•	2015 – Executive Producer and producer for Let's Think About It Season 1 (Social Cohesion/Manpower Concerns/Future as a Global City);

•	2015 – Executive Producer and producer for Let's Think About It Season 2 (Retirement/Population/Education)

•	2016 – Executive Producer and producer for Let's Think About It Season 3 (SkillsFuture)

•	2016 – Executive Producer and producer for Let's Think About It Season 4 (Multiculturalism);

•	2017 – Executive Producer and producer for Let's Think About It Season 5 (Committee on Future Economy);

•	2017 – Executive Producer and producer for Let's Think About It Season 6 (Preschool Education)

• 2018 – Produced Lee Kuan Yew Bilingual Fund Languages Campaign;[24]

• 2019 – Produced Passion Made Possible Campaign(feat. Ashley Isham,[25] Tan Min Liang,[26] Han Sai Por,[27] Shabir,[28] Sabrina Tan[29] & Ang Kiam Meng[30]);

• 2019 – Executive Producer and producer for "Happy Moments @ Ascott" branding videos for The Ascott Limited. Shot in Singapore, Tokyo and Paris;[31][32]

• 2020 – Executive Producer for COVID19 Video - 'If anyone can do it, it's Singapore' for MCI

• 2020 - G.E. Campaign Videos

• 2021 - Consultant for Prudential Socials and Comms (Asia);

• 2021 - Shaping Hearts (North East Community Development Council);

Awards 

 Awarded 'The Most Outstanding Composition Award' at the Asia Popular Song Festival in 1981

Personal life

Ken is married to Judy Hsu, a Taiwanese Canadian and Singaporean PR who is currently the Regional Chief Executive Officer (ASEAN & South Asia) of Standard Chartered Bank. They met while she was a recording artist more than 37 years ago. They have two boys.

References

External links

 

Living people
Singaporean people of Chinese descent
Singaporean composers
Singaporean musicians
1964 births
Music promoters